Joaquín Larraín (born 31 December 1953) is a Chilean equestrian. He competed in the individual jumping event at the 2000 Summer Olympics.

References

External links
 

1953 births
Living people
Chilean male equestrians
Olympic equestrians of Chile
Equestrians at the 2000 Summer Olympics
Place of birth missing (living people)
20th-century Chilean people
21st-century Chilean people